Everette Louis Stephens (born October 21, 1966) is a retired American professional basketball player who was selected by the Philadelphia 76ers in the 2nd round (31st overall) of the 1988 NBA Draft. A 6'2" guard from Purdue University, Stephens played in two NBA seasons for the Indiana Pacers and Milwaukee Bucks. In his NBA career, Stephens played in 38 games and scored a total of 71 points.  During his CBA career, Stephens won the 1994 Long Distance Shootout Contest.

Everette played overseas in Australia (Newcastle and Geelong), Cyprus, Spain, France, Germany, and Venezuela.

Stephens' son Kendall played basketball at St. Charles East High School in suburban Chicago and played College Basketball at Purdue University and University of Nevada, Reno. Stephens served as an assistant coach for his son's team.

References

External links
College & NBA stats @ basketballreference.com

1966 births
Living people
African-American basketball players
American expatriate basketball people in Australia
American expatriate basketball people in Canada
American men's basketball players
Basketball players from Illinois
Cedar Rapids Silver Bullets players
Evanston Township High School alumni
Fargo-Moorhead Fever players
Geelong Supercats players
Indiana Pacers players
La Crosse Catbirds players
Milwaukee Bucks players
Newcastle Falcons (basketball) players
Philadelphia 76ers draft picks
Point guards
Purdue Boilermakers men's basketball players
Rockford Lightning players
Sportspeople from Evanston, Illinois
American expatriate basketball people in the Philippines
Great Taste Coffee Makers players
Philippine Basketball Association imports
21st-century African-American people
20th-century African-American sportspeople